RDS-127 is a drug which is used in scientific research. It acts as a D2-like receptor agonist and also has some serotonin and adrenergic agonist effects, as well as some anticholinergic action, and produces both anorectic and pro-sexual effects in animal studies.

See also 
 Bay R 1531
 UH-232

References 

Dopamine agonists
Serotonin receptor agonists
2-Aminoindanes
Phenol ethers